The Marian Smoluchowski Medal is a Polish annual science award conferred by the Polish Physical Society (Polskie Towarzystwo Fizyczne, PTF) for contributions in the field of physics.

Description
The medal was established in 1965 and is the highest award presented by the Polish Physical Society. It was named in honour of physicist Marian Smoluchowski (1872 – 1917). It is awarded to scientists whose work significantly contributed to the advancement of one of the branches of physics irrespective of the scientific degree, place of work or nationality of the laureate. It can be given for a single published work or as a lifetime achievement award. It is conferred by the Awards Committee of the Polish Physical Society, currently, no more than once a year.

Laureates
The list of scientists awarded with Marian Smoluchowski Medal:

Iwo Białynicki-Birula (2021)
Józef Spałek (2019)
Jerzy Lukierski (2017)
Henryk Szymczak (2015)
not awarded (2014)
Jan Misiewicz (2013)
Douglas Cline (2012)
Krzysztof Pomorski (2011)
Tomasz Dietl (2010)
Wojciech H. Zurek (2009)
Józef Barnaś (2008)
Robert Gałązka (2007)
Jan Żylicz (2005)
Andrzej Białas (2004)
Stefan Pokorski (2003)
David Shugar (2002)
Aleksander Wolszczan (2001)
Bohdan Paczyński (2000)
Andrzej Kajetan Wróblewski (1999)
Kacper Zalewski (1998)
Włodzimierz Zawadzki (1997)
Ryszard Sosnowski (1994)
Stanisław Kielich (1993)
Arnold Wolfendale (1992)
Jacek Prentki (1991)
Władysław Świątecki (1990)
Zdzisław Szymański (1989)
Andrzej Hrynkiewicz (1988)
Wojciech Królikowski (1987)
Andrzej Trautman (1986)
Joseph Henry Eberly (1985)
Vitaly Ginzburg (1984); 2003 Nobel Prize in Physics
Jan Rzewuski (1983)
Władysław Opęchowski (1982)
Adriano Gozzini (1981)
Ben R. Mottelson (1980); 1975 Nobel Prize in Physics
Włodzimierz Trzebiatowski (1979)
Victor Frederick Weisskopf (1977)
Arkadiusz Piekara (1976)
Gerald Pearson (1975)
Georgy Flyorov (1974) 
Subrahmanyan Chandrasekhar (1973), 1983 Nobel Prize in Physics
Leonard Sosnowski (1972)
Jerzy Gierula (1970)
Marian Mięsowicz (1970)
Marian Danysz (1969)
Jerzy Pniewski (1969)
Aleksander Jabłoński (1968)
Wojciech Rubinowicz (1965)

See also
Prize of the Foundation for Polish Science
Timeline of Polish science and technology

References

Physics awards
Polish awards
Polish science and technology awards